Hubert Dennis Considine (July 1, 1919–September 23, 1974) was an American politician and businessman.

Considine was born in Harmon, Illinois. He went to the Harmon public schools and graduated from St. Mary's High School in Sterling, Illinois. Considine served as a pilot in the United States Army Air Forces, during World War II, and was commissioned a first lieutenant. Considine was involved with the automobile and farm implement business. He lived in Dixon, Illinois with his wife and family. Considine served in the Illinois House of Representatives from 1947 to 1957 and was a Democrat. Considine died at the People's Hospital La Salle-Peru, Illinois.

Notes

External links

1919 births
1974 deaths
People from Dixon, Illinois
Military personnel from Illinois
United States Army Air Forces pilots of World War II
Businesspeople from Illinois
Members of the Illinois House of Representatives
20th-century American politicians
20th-century American businesspeople